Kozhevnikov (masculine) or Kozhevnikova (masculine genitive or feminine) is a Russian surname. Notable people with the surname include:

Aleksandr Kozhevnikov (disambiguation), multiple people
Alexandre Kojève (1902–1968), Russian-born French intellectual, born Kozhevnikov
Aleksei Kozhevnikov (1836–1902), Russian physician
Fyodor Kozhevnikov (1893–1998), Soviet legal expert
Galina Kozhevnikova (1974–2011), Russian journalist
Grigorii Kozhevnikov (1866–1933), Russian entomologist
Innokentiy Kozhevnikov (1879–1931), Russian Red Army commander in the Russian Civil War.
Maria Kozhevnikova (born 1984), Russian actress and politician
Nadezhda Kozhevnikova (born 1949), Russian writer, daughter of Vadim Kozhevnikov
Sergey Kozhevnikov (born 1970), Russian middle-distance runner
Vadim Kozhevnikov (1909–1984), Soviet writer
Yelizaveta Kozhevnikova (born 1973), Russian freestyle skier

See also
Kozhevnikova Bay, a place on the southern shore of the Laptev Sea

Russian-language surnames